

NCAA Bowl games

 December 20, 2014 – January 12, 2015: 2014–15 NCAA football bowl games

Regular bowl games

 December 20, 2014 – January 4, 2015: 2014–15 NCAA non-CFP bowl games
 December 20, 2014: 2014 R+L Carriers New Orleans Bowl
 The Louisiana–Lafayette Ragin' Cajuns defeated the Nevada Wolf Pack 16–3.
 December 20, 2014: 2014 Gildan New Mexico Bowl in Albuquerque
 The Utah State Aggies defeated the UTEP Miners 21–6.
 December 20, 2014: 2014 Royal Purple Las Vegas Bowl
 The Utah Utes defeated the Colorado State Rams 45–10.
 December 20, 2014: 2014 Famous Idaho Potato Bowl in Boise
 The Air Force Falcons defeated the Western Michigan Broncos 38–24.
 December 20, 2014: 2014 Camellia Bowl in Montgomery, Alabama (returning as an NCAA Division I bowl game again)
 The Bowling Green Falcons defeated the South Alabama Jaguars 33–28.
 December 22, 2014: 2014 Miami Beach Bowl (debut event)
 The Memphis Tigers defeated the BYU Cougars 55–48.
 December 23, 2014: 2014 Boca Raton Bowl in 
 The Marshall Thundering Herd defeated the Northern Illinois Huskies 52–23.
 December 23, 2014: 2014 San Diego County Credit Union Poinsettia Bowl
 The Navy Midshipmen defeated the San Diego State Aztecs 17–16.
 December 24, 2014: 2014 Bahamas Bowl in Nassau (debut event)
 The Western Kentucky Hilltoppers defeated the Central Michigan Chippewas 49–48.
 December 24, 2014: 2014 Hawaii Bowl in Honolulu
 The Rice Owls defeated the Fresno State Bulldogs 30–6.
 December 26, 2014: 2014 Zaxby's Heart of Dallas Bowl
 The Louisiana Tech Bulldogs defeated the Illinois Fighting Illini 35–18.
 December 26, 2014: 2014 Quick Lane Bowl in Detroit (debut event)
 The Rutgers Scarlet Knights defeated the North Carolina Tar Heels 40–21.
 December 26, 2014: 2014 St. Petersburg Bowl in St. Petersburg, Florida
 The NC State Wolfpack defeated the UCF Knights 34–27.
 December 27, 2014: 2014 Military Bowl in Annapolis, Maryland
 The Virginia Tech Hokies defeated the Cincinnati Bearcats 33–17.
 December 27, 2014: 2014 Sun Bowl in El Paso, Texas
 The Arizona State Sun Devils defeated the Duke Blue Devils 36–31.
 December 27, 2014: 2014 Independence Bowl in Shreveport, Louisiana
 The South Carolina Gamecocks defeated the Miami Hurricanes 24–21.
 December 27, 2014: 2014 Pinstripe Bowl in the Bronx (New York City)
 The Penn State Nittany Lions defeated the Boston College Eagles 31–30.
 December 27, 2014: 2014 Holiday Bowl in San Diego
 The USC Trojans defeated the Nebraska Cornhuskers 45–42.
 December 29, 2014: 2014 Liberty Bowl in Memphis, Tennessee
 The Texas A&M Aggies defeated the West Virginia Mountaineers 45–37.
 December 29, 2014: 2014 Russell Athletic Bowl in Orlando, Florida
 The Clemson Tigers defeated the Oklahoma Sooners 40–6.
 December 29, 2014: 2014 Texas Bowl in Houston
 The Arkansas Razorbacks defeated the Texas Longhorns 31–7.
 December 30, 2014: 2014 Music City Bowl in Nashville, Tennessee
 The Notre Dame Fighting Irish defeated the LSU Tigers 31–28.
 December 30, 2014: 2014 Belk Bowl in Charlotte, North Carolina
 The Georgia Bulldogs defeated the Louisville Cardinals 37–14.
 December 30, 2014: 2014 Foster Farms Bowl in Santa Clara, California
 The Stanford Cardinal defeated the Maryland Terrapins 45–21.
 January 1, 2015: 2015 Citrus Bowl in Orlando, Florida
 The Missouri Tigers defeated the Minnesota Golden Gophers 33–17.
 January 1, 2015: 2015 Outback Bowl in Tampa, Florida
 The Wisconsin Badgers defeated the Auburn Tigers, 34–31, after overtime.
 January 2, 2015: 2015 Armed Forces Bowl in Fort Worth, Texas
 The Houston Cougars defeated the Pittsburgh Panthers 35–34.
 January 2, 2015: 2015 TaxSlayer Bowl in Jacksonville, Florida
 The Tennessee Volunteers defeated the Iowa Hawkeyes 45–28.
 January 2, 2015: 2015 Alamo Bowl in San Antonio
 The UCLA Bruins defeated the Kansas State Wildcats 40–35.
 January 2, 2015: 2015 Cactus Bowl in Tempe, Arizona
 The Oklahoma State Cowboys defeated the Washington Huskies 30–22.
 January 3, 2015: 2015 Birmingham Bowl in Birmingham, Alabama
 The Florida Gators defeated the East Carolina Pirates 28–20.
 January 4, 2015: 2015 GoDaddy Bowl in Mobile, Alabama
 The Toledo Rockets defeated the Arkansas State Red Wolves 63–44.

College Football Playoff (CFP) bowl games

 December 31, 2014 and January 1, 2015: 2014–15 CFP bowl games
 December 31: 2014 Chick-fil-A Peach Bowl in Atlanta
 The TCU Horned Frogs defeated the Ole Miss Rebels 42–3.
 December 31: 2014 Vizio Fiesta Bowl in Glendale, Arizona
 The Boise State Broncos defeated the Arizona Wildcats 38–30.
 December 31: 2014 Capital One Orange Bowl in Miami Gardens, Florida
 The Georgia Tech Yellow Jackets defeated the Mississippi State Bulldogs 42–20.
 January 1: 2015 Goodyear Cotton Bowl Classic in Arlington, Texas
 The Michigan State Spartans defeated the Baylor Bears 42–41.
 January 1: 2015 Rose Bowl Game presented by Northwestern Mutual in Pasadena, California
 The Oregon Ducks defeated the Florida State Seminoles 59–20. 
 January 1: 2015 Allstate Sugar Bowl in New Orleans
 The Ohio State Buckeyes defeated the Alabama Crimson Tide 42–35.
Oregon and Ohio State advanced to the 2015 College Football Playoff National Championship.

College Football Playoff National Championship

 January 12: 2015 College Football Playoff National Championship in Arlington, Texas (debut event)
 The Ohio State Buckeyes defeat the Oregon Ducks 42–20. It is the Buckeyes' eighth national title and first since 2002.

Other American football events
 January 25: 2015 Pro Bowl in Glendale, Arizona (University of Phoenix Stadium)
 Team Michael Irvin defeated Team Cris Carter 32–28.
 Offensive MVP: Matthew Stafford (Detroit Lions)
 Defensive MVP: J. J. Watt (Houston Texans)
 February 1: Super Bowl XLIX in the same location as the 2015 Pro Bowl venue.
 The New England Patriots defeated the Seattle Seahawks, 28–24, to win their fourth Super Bowl title.
 Super Bowl MVP: Tom Brady (New England Patriots)
 April 30 – May 2: 2015 NFL draft in Chicago, at the Auditorium Theatre
 #1 pick: Jameis Winston (Florida State Seminoles) to the Tampa Bay Buccaneers
 July 8 – 19: 2015 IFAF World Championship in Canton, Ohio
 The  defeated , 59–12, to win their third consecutive IFAF World Championship title.  won the bronze medal.
 September 10, 2015 – January 3, 2016: 2015 NFL season

Pro Football Hall of Fame
Class of 2015:
Jerome Bettis, player
Tim Brown, player
Charles Haley, player
Bill Polian, general manager
Junior Seau, player
Will Shields, player
Mick Tingelhoff, player
Ron Wolf, general manager

References